Likhauri is a village in the Ozurgeti district of Guria in western Georgia.

References
 Georgian Soviet Encyclopedia Vol. 6, p. 270, 1977.

Geography of Georgia (country)